Rizky Dwi Ramadhana (born March 7, 1992 in Palembang, South Sumatra) is an Indonesian professional footballer who plays as a forward for Liga 3 club PS Palembang.

Club career

Sriwijaya FC
Ramadhana made his debut for Sriwijaya on July 5, 2012, in a 2–1 win over Pelita Bandung Raya, replacing Muhammad Ridwan in the second minute of stoppage time.

Ramadhana scored his first league goal for the Elang Andalas on September 5, 2014, in the last regular match day of the 2014 Indonesia Super League season in a 3–2 loss to Persib Bandung.

Muba Babel United
He was signed for Muba Babel United to play in Liga 2 in the 2020 season. This season was suspended on 27 March 2020 due to the COVID-19 pandemic. The season was abandoned and was declared void on 20 January 2021.

Career statistics

Club

Honours

Club 
Sriwijaya
 Indonesian Super League: 2011–12
Sriwijaya U-21
 Indonesia Super League U-21: 2012–13

Individual 
 Indonesia Super League U-21 Best Player: 2012–13
 Indonesia Super League U-21 Top Goalscorer: 2012–13 (9 goals)

References

External links 
 

1992 births
Living people
People from Palembang
Sportspeople from South Sumatra
Association football forwards
Indonesian footballers
Liga 1 (Indonesia) players
Sriwijaya F.C. players
Indonesia youth international footballers
21st-century Indonesian people